The North County News Tribune, formerly the Fullerton News Tribune was once the oldest continuously published independent daily newspaper in Orange County, California. Since a 1992 sale to Freedom Newspapers, its operations have been folded into the Orange County Register. The Register is currently a property of Digital First Media.

History 
Founded by Edgar Johnson with over 300+ subscribers in 1891, the newspaper was first published as the Weekly Tribune of Orange County. By 1914, The Tribune had moved to 5 times a week publication.

The News Tribune name was the product of the 1926 merger of the Fullerton News and the Fullerton Daily Tribune. After the merger, the News Tribune was sold three years later for $125,000 to W. Kee Maxwell in 1929.

In the early and middle part of the 20th century, the Fullerton News Tribune was one of the more modern California daily newspaper organizations; it was the first California newspaper to print with Linotype printing presses, and the first small city daily in Southern California to have leased a teletype news wire and a UPI photo wire service.

The Fullerton News Tribune was sold to Edgar F. Elstrom in 1939. Elfstrom had worked as the secretary to newspaper magnate E.W. Scripps The Daily News Tribune grew in circulation over the next 30 years, and had a daily home delivery and newsstand circulation 6 days a week in the growing cities of Fullerton, Brea, Placentia, Yorba Linda, La Habra, Buena Park, and also two small northern sections of Anaheim and Villa Park. In mid 1973 the News Tribune, over 4 months, gradually switched from traditional hot lead linotype processing of typesetting and press plates to cold type press printing. The changeover to cold type press plates was completed in the late summer of 1973. The News Tribune's maximum circulation during the late 1970s was just over 29,500 newspapers printed and distributed Monday thru Saturday. Many News Tribune editorial staffers then believed the News Tribune could have grown in circulation far more rapidly in the late '60s and '70s by venturing circulation into rapidly growing Anaheim. At that time, Anaheim had a small daily newspaper, The Anaheim Bulletin, a newspaper which had a five days a week daily circulation of only about 7,500. Daily Tribune staffers were told News Tribune owner Edgar Elfstrom had a handshake agreement with Santa Ana Register owner R.C. Hoiles to not expand the News Tribune into greater parts of Anaheim, Villa Park, and Orange. In return, the Santa Ana Register would not actively expand more into the News Tribune's primary North Orange County circulation areas.

On December 28, 1973, after deciding to retire, Daily News Tribune owner Edgar Elfstrom sold the News Tribune to the Scripps-Howard Newspaper chain. Over the next 10 years, the Daily News Tribune was not actively supported by Scripps Howard, a very large news organization chain which had no other daily newspapers west of Denver, Colorado. After 1978, the News Tribune experienced ongoing declines in circulation, and in consultation with its parent company, Scripps Howard, the newspaper cut nearly 25% of the paper's editorial staff in 1983. The newspaper then also reduced daily coverage areas, and the News Tribune finally changed to once weekly publication in 1985. Until it moved to a weekly publication schedule in 1985, The Daily News Tribune was Orange County's longest-running daily newspaper. The Daily News Tribune was purchased in 1987 by Community Media Enterprises. In 1992, The News Tribune was sold to Freedom Newspapers of Santa Ana, for an undisclosed sum. Freedom Newspapers also owned the Orange County Register and the Fullerton News Tribune became a local weekly edition of the larger Register.

References

Orange County, California